Janda (Gilan, Gelan) is a village and the district center of Gelan District, Ghazni Province, Afghanistan. The houses are made of mud bricks and the streets are unpaved.

The town is located within the heartland of the Tarakai tribe of Ghilji Pashtuns.

See also
 Ghazni Province

References

Populated places in Ghazni Province